The Arnold Palmer Invitational is a professional golf tournament on the PGA Tour. It is played each March at the Bay Hill Club and Lodge, a private golf resort owned since 1974 by Arnold Palmer in Bay Hill, a suburb southwest of Orlando, Florida.

The event was founded in 1979 as a successor to the Florida Citrus Open Invitational, which debuted in 1966 and was played at Rio Pinar Country Club, east of Orlando, through 1978. Arnold Palmer won the Florida Citrus Open in 1971.

Since 1979, the tournament title has had a number of different names, most of them including "Bay Hill," but has played under the Palmer name since 2007. On March 21, 2012, the Arnold Palmer Invitational and MasterCard Worldwide announced an extension to MasterCard's "Presented by" sponsorship until the 2016 tournament.

In June 2014, the PGA Tour approved a resolution to grant the winner a three-year exemption, one more than regular Tour events and on par with winners of the World Golf Championships, The Tour Championship, and the Memorial Tournament.

The winner receives a red cardigan sweater in memory of Arnold Palmer, a tradition that began with the 2017 tournament after Palmer's death in 2016.

In 2019, the event was added to the Open Qualifying Series, giving up to three non-exempt players entry into The Open Championship.

Invitational status
The Arnold Palmer Invitational is one of only five tournaments given "invitational" status by the PGA Tour, and consequently it has a reduced field of only 120 players (as compared to most full-field open tournaments that have fields of 144 or 156 players).  The other four tournaments with invitational status are the Genesis Open, RBC Heritage, the Fort Worth Invitational, and the Memorial Tournament.  Invitational tournaments have smaller fields (between 120 and 132 players), and have more freedom than full-field open tournaments in determining which players are eligible to participate in their event, as invitational tournaments are not required to fill their fields using the PGA Tour Priority Ranking System.  Furthermore, unlike full-field open tournaments, invitational tournaments do not offer open qualifying (aka Monday qualifying).

Field
The field consists of 120 players invited using the following criteria:
 Arnold Palmer Invitational winners prior to 2000 and in the last five years
 The Players Championship and major championship winners in the last five years
 The Tour Championship, World Golf Championships, and Memorial Tournament winners in the past three years
 Tournament winners in the past year
 Playing member of last named U.S. Ryder Cup team; current PGA Tour members who were playing members on last named European Ryder Cup team, U.S. Presidents Cup team, and International Presidents Cup team
 Prior year U.S. Amateur winner (if still an amateur)
 Top 50 Official World Golf Ranking (as of Friday prior)
 PGA Tour life members
 18 sponsors exemptions– 2 from Web.com Tour finals, 8 members not otherwise exempt, and 8 unrestricted
 Up to two foreign players designated by the commissioner
 Top 70 from prior year's FedEx Cup points list
 Members in top 125 non-member category whose prior year non-WGC points equal or exceed the 70th position on the prior year FedEx Cup points list
 Top 70 from current year's FedEx Cup points list (as of Friday prior)
 PGA Section (North Florida) champion/player of the year
 Remaining positions filled from current year's FedEx Cup points list
Arnold Palmer had a lifetime invitation.

Tournament highlights
1966: Lionel Hebert wins the inaugural version of the tournament. He wins by two shots over Jack Nicklaus, Charles Coody, and Dick Lytle.
1968: Dan Sikes breaks out of a 5-way logjam to win by one shot over Tom Weiskopf. At the end of 54 holes, Sikes had been tied for the lead with Jack Nicklaus, Bruce Devlin, Miller Barber, and Bob Charles. Officials said this was the first time there had ever been a five-way tie for the lead after 54 holes at a PGA event.
1971: Arnold Palmer wins the event eight years before he becomes its host. He beats Julius Boros by one shot.
1973: Vietnam War veteran Buddy Allin shoots a tournament record 23 under par to breeze to an eight shot victory over Charles Coody.
1974: Jerry Heard becomes the tournament's first two-time winner. He beats Homero Blancas and Jim Jamieson by two shots.
1976: Early on a Monday morning, Hale Irwin defeats Kermit Zarley on the sixth hole of a sudden death playoff after play was suspended due to darkness on Sunday. While speaking to the press on Sunday evening, Irwin blamed NBC Sports for there not being enough time to finish the playoff.
1979: Bob Byman wins the first edition of the tournament to be played at Bay Hill. He defeats John Schroeder on the second hole of a sudden death playoff.
1980: Dave Eichelberger wins by three shots over Leonard Thompson. The temperatures were so cold that Eichelberger wore panty hose during the final round.
1982: Tom Kite chips in for birdie on the first hole of a sudden death playoff to defeat Jack Nicklaus and Denis Watson.
1984: Gary Koch shoots a final round 63 before defeating George Burns on the second hole of a sudden death playoff. Koch is the only champion in the tournament's history to win both at Rio Pinar and Bay Hill.
1985: Coming off back surgery less than six months previously, Fuzzy Zoeller wins at Bay Hill. He finishes two shots ahead of  Tom Watson.
1987:  Payne Stewart, who owned a home just off Bay Hill's 12th tee, notches his third career PGA Tour title. He beats David Frost by three shots.
1989: Tom Kite wins for a second time at Bay Hill by defeating Davis Love III on the second hole of a sudden death playoff. Before the playoff took place, both Kite and Love made double bogey on the tournament's 72nd hole.
1990: Robert Gamez holes a 7-iron on the 72nd hole for an eagle two allowing him to win by one shot over Greg Norman.
1992: Fred Couples wins by nine shots over Gene Sauers. With his win, Couples becomes the #1 ranked player in the world.
1995: Loren Roberts becomes the first returning champion to successfully defend his title. He beats Brad Faxon by two shots.
1996: Paul Goydos wins for the first time on the PGA Tour. He beats Jeff Maggert by one shot and Tom Purtzer by two. During the tournament's second round, Purtzer incurred a two-shot penalty by playing the wrong ball.
1998: During the tournament's final round, John Daly hits six balls in the water on the sixth hole. He finishes the hole with a final score of 18.
2000: Tiger Woods wins at Bay Hill for the first time. He beats Davis Love III by four shots.
2003: Tiger Woods becomes the first golfer since Gene Sarazen at the 1930 Miami Open to win the same tournament in four consecutive years. He wins by 11 shots over Kirk Triplett, Stewart Cink, Kenny Perry, and Brad Faxon.
2005: Kenny Perry wins by two shots over Vijay Singh and Graeme McDowell. Perry and Singh were tied for the lead until Singh made double bogey at the 72nd hole.
2008: Tiger Woods sinks a 25-foot birdie putt at the 72nd hole to defeat Bart Bryant by one shot. It's Woods fifth Bay Hill triumph in addition to his winning the fifth consecutive tournament he had played in.
2009: Tiger Woods wins at Bay Hill for the 2nd straight year and sixth time overall. He birdies the 72nd hole to defeat Sean O'Hair by one shot.
2012: Tiger Woods wins the Arnold Palmer Invitational for the seventh time, ending a winless streak on the PGA Tour dating back 27 events to September 13, 2009.
2013: Tiger Woods wins for a record-tying eighth time at the Arnold Palmer Invitational while holing three eagles during the week, the first time a player has accomplished the feat since 2001; he ascends to the number 1 ranking for the first time since October 2010.
2014: With world number one Woods out of the tournament, the focus was on world number two Adam Scott. Scott led the first three rounds, but struggled in the fourth round, finishing third behind Keegan Bradley and first-time PGA Tour winner Matt Every.
2015: Matt Every holed an 18-foot birdie putt on the 72nd hole to beat Henrik Stenson by one shot and become the third golfer to defend his title at the Arnold Palmer Invitational. In the third round, Daniel Berger recorded a double eagle at the par-5 6th hole, the first since the tournament moved to Bay Hill in 1979. Zach Johnson repeated the feat in the final round on the par-5 16th.

Course layout

Source:

Winners 

Note: Green highlight indicates scoring records.
Sources:

Multiple winners
Seven men have won this tournament more than once through 2022.
8 wins
Tiger Woods: 2000, 2001, 2002, 2003, 2008, 2009, 2012, 2013
2 wins
Jerry Heard: 1972, 1974
Gary Koch: 1977, 1984
Tom Kite: 1982, 1989
Loren Roberts: 1994, 1995
Ernie Els: 1998, 2010
Matt Every: 2014, 2015

Notes

References

External links

Coverage on the PGA Tour's official site
Bay Hill Club and Lodge
Rio Pinar Country Club

PGA Tour events
Golf in Orlando, Florida
Sports competitions in Orlando, Florida
Recurring sporting events established in 1966
Arnold Palmer
1966 establishments in Florida